Belgrade, Serbia has an abundance of religious architecture. The city has numerous Serbian Orthodox churches and temples and it is also the seat of the Patriarch of the Serbian Orthodox Church. Its two most prominent Orthodox Christian places of worship are the Saborna Crkva (the Cathedral Church) and the Temple of St. Sava, the largest Eastern Orthodox church in the world.

Other notable Belgrade churches include St. Mark's Church, in which rests the body of the first Serbian Emperor, Stefan Dušan. The architecture of this church was greatly inspired by the Gračanica monastery in the province of Kosovo. The church of Sveta Ružica in the Kalemegdan Fortress is one of the holiest places in Belgrade for Serbian Orthodox Christians since this was the site where the body of St. Paraskeva was preserved for several years after the Ottoman conquest, before being taken to Romania where it still rests today. St. Paraskeva (Sv. Petka) is one of the most important saints to the Eastern Orthodox Christians.

Belgrade is the seat of a Catholic archdiocese, with a small Catholic community and several Catholic churches. One of these, St Anthony's, was designed by the noted Slovenian architect Jože Plečnik.

There is also a Muslim community in Belgrade and only one mosque, the Bajrakli Mosque built in 1526 by the Ottoman Sultan, Suleiman the Magnificent.  It is one of the oldest surviving structures in contemporary Belgrade.

The Jewish community is served by the Belgrade Synagogue, which is the only currently active Jewish place of worship in the entire country, although not the only such structure within the city limits.

Belgrade also had an active Buddhist temple in the first half of the 20th century.  It was built by East Russian expatriates fleeing the outcome of the Bolshevik Revolution of 1917.

Orthodox

 Church of St. Alexander Nevsky, Dorćol
 Church of St. Basil of Ostrog, Bežanija
 Church of St. Nicholas, Zvezdara
 Church of St. George, Banovo Brdo
 Church of St. George, Oplenac
 Church of St. Jovan Vladimir, Voždovac
 Church of St. Tryphon, Čukarica
 Church of Saint Sava, Vračar
 Church of the Convocation of Serbian Saints, Palilula
 Church of the Holy Apostles Peter and Paul, Topčider
 Church of the Holy Father Nikolaj, Zemun, built in 1725–1731
 Church of the Holy Trinity, Voždovac
 Church of the Holy Trinity, Vračar
 Church of the Holy Trinity, Zemun
 Russian Church of the Holy Trinity
 Church of the Holy Emperor Lazar
 Church of the Nativity of the Most Holy Mother of God, Zemun, built in 1780
 Church of the Nativity of the Most Holy Mother of God, Zvezdara
 Church of the Nativity of St. John the Baptist, Voždovac
 Ružica Church, Kalemegdan
 St. Michael's Cathedral
 St. Mark's Church
 Monastery of St. Archangel Gabriel, Zemun, its church was built in 1786, on a site of older church
 Crkva Svetog Dimitrija (Zemun)
 
 Rajinovac monastery
 New Cemetery Church

Roman Catholic
Co-cathedral of Christ the King in Belgrade, built in 1927
Church of St. Anthony of Padua, Belgrade
Crkva uznesenja blažene djevice Marije (Zemun), built in 1795, Roman Catholic, built on a site of previous mosque
Crkva svetog Roka (Zemun), built in 1836, Roman Catholic
Samostan Svetog Ivana Krstitelja i Antuna (Zemun), built in 1750-1752, Franciscan/Roman Catholic

Islamic
Bajrakli Mosque, Belgrade

Protestant
Evangelical Church, Zemun, built in 1920s, Evangelical

Synagogues
The Sukkat Shalom Belgrade Synagogue
Zemun Synagogue, built in early 20th century, sold to a restaurant owner during Slobodan Milošević's rule, but the Jewish Municipality of Zemun is trying to recuperate the building.

See also
Architecture of Serbia

References

Architecture
Culture in Belgrade
Religious architecture
Architecture in Serbia

Serbia religion-related lists
Churches